Febrile infection-related epilepsy syndrome (FIRES) is an epilepsy syndrome in which new-onset refractory status epilepticus (NORSE) is preceded by febrile illness 24 hours to 2 weeks prior to the onset of seizures. The term was previously used for a paediatric syndrome but was redefined to include all ages.

FIRES was previously to refer to this syndrome in children aged three to fifteen years old. A healthy child that may have been ill in the last few days or with a lingering fever goes into a state of continuous seizures. The seizures are resistant to seizure medications and treatments, though barbiturates may be administered.  Medical diagnostic tests may initially return no clear diagnosis and may not detect any obvious swelling on the brain. The syndrome is very rare: it may only affect 1 in 1,000,000 children.

Febrile infection-related epilepsy syndrome (FIRES) is an infrequent, severe, and potentially deadly childhood epileptic syndrome. It can be described as potentially deadly or infrequent catastrophic epileptic encephalopathy. The characteristics of FIRES are repeated seizures, and febrile illness but no signs of infections. Febrile infection-related epilepsy syndrome (FIRES) was introduced by van Baalen and colleagues in 2010.  FIRES also points to the severe clinical progression often consequential in global brain atrophy and poor outcome. NORSE describes a condition in which a healthy person who has not had seizures before, begins having seizures. The clinical progression of FIRES is frequently consequential in global brain atrophy, the outcome of that is very poor. Initial mortality and morbidity are significant, and most survivors are left with drug-resistant multifocal epilepsy and variable degrees of intellectual disability. A fever in an otherwise healthy child is supposedly a risk factor for Febrile Infection-Related Epilepsy Syndrome frequent. The consequence of FIRES is unfortunate, the death rate of up to 30%. FIRES is an immune disorder triggered by an infection. Between 10 and 11.7% of patients die during the acute phase of FIRES either due to obstinate status epilepticus or complications of treatment, including sepsis.

It can be assumed that FIRES is associated with metabolic problems, infection, and autoimmune disorders. Affected patients have an unremarkable neurological history and, in close relation with a febrile illness (mainly upper respiratory tract infection or, less frequently, gastroenteritis), abruptly develop several seizures. Electroencephalography (EEG) abnormalities in the hyperacute phase of FIRES. FIRES is characterized by the onset of fever between 24 hours and 2 weeks before the onset of SE and the fever has usually resolved when the seizures start. In the acute phase, SE is particularly obstinate to treatment and can last for many weeks. This is followed by a chronic phase of intractable epilepsy, usually accompanied by cognitive impairment of variable severity. An inflammation can results in acetonemia, raises of fatty acids, inflection of glycemia, and comparative caloric limit.

Signs and symptoms
FIRES start with a febrile illness up to two weeks before seizure onset. The clinical characteristic of FIRES is the onset of fever before the onset of SE. The fever gradually decreases and then subsides when the seizures occurred. SE is obstinate to treatment and continued for a few weeks. The chronic phase of uncontrollable epilepsy leads to various degree of cognitive impairments. These seizures damage the frontal lobe's cognitive brain function such as memory and sensory abilities. behavioral disorders, memory issues, sensory changes, and possibly death. Children continue to have seizures throughout their lives. Prolonged status epilepticus triggered motor disability in the patients with FIRES. The severity of symptoms vary person to person, there are few symptoms that can be seen in a person with FIRES. The severity of symptoms vary person to person, there are few symptoms that can be seen in a person with FIRES. Before any neurological symptoms, fever can be observed in many cases, afterward seizures developed. Cognitive ability can be impaired by repeated and continuous seizures. The damage mainly occurred in frontal and temporal lobe regions and resulted in learning disorder, memory function impairment, and motor function impairment.

Autoimmunity
Behavioral abnormality
Cough
Developmental regression
Focal-onset seizure
Headache
Lethargy
Pain in muscle
Sinus inflammation 
EEG abnormality
Fever
Myalgia

Cause
The cause of FIRES is not known. The reasons behind Febrile Infection-Related Epilepsy Syndrome are unidentified. There are some common clinical symptoms, such as onset after a nonspecific febrile illness, gastrointestinal illness, or upper respiratory infection. This prior illness is often cleared 1–14 days prior to the patient's first seizures. It can be assumed that it is associated with metabolic problems, infection, and autoimmune disorders. There are theories of an immunological source, a genetic predisposition, and an inflammation-mediated process, but the definite cause is unknown. It is more common in boys than girls. Fever is supposedly a risk factor for Febrile Infection-Related Epilepsy Syndrome. As FIRES is an autoimmune disorder, any infection can be activated it. Neuroinflammation can also be observed as one of the underlying causes of FIRES.

Diagnosis
FIRES is difficult to diagnose due to its rarity and lack of definitive biomarkers. The diagnosis of FIRES is mostly clinically based due to a lack of identified sources. The clinical features consist of remediable and not remediable infections and metabolic causes which help to develop the super-refractory SE, which leads to febrile illness. It is often diagnosed by ruling out other options such as infectious, toxic, metabolic, and genetic causes. FIRES can be misinterpreted as infection encephalitis, this is one of the great reasons for misdiagnosed FIRES. There is no availability of genetic testing or biological markers. The patients presented with a history of febrile illness moistly upper respiratory tract infection, gastroenteritis, etc., and also numerous episodes of seizures (50-10/day), which developed shortly. Hyperacute phase abnormalities can be seen in EEG findings for FIRES.

FIRES can be diagnosed by the below-mentioned examinations:

Complete physical examination
Thorough medical history evaluation
Assessment of signs and symptoms
Laboratory tests
Imaging studies

Epidemiology
FIRES is a rare disease estimated prevalence of 1-10 per 100,000. The mortality and morbidity rate in Febrile infection-related epilepsy syndrome (FIRES) is significantly high. Those who have survived due to the medication therapy have acquired drug-resistant epilepsy and also intellectual disability. Febrile infection-related epilepsy syndrome (FIRES) affected both adults as well as children, but it is more common in children. The consequence of FIRES is unfortunate, the death rate of up to 30%. Among 60%-100% of the children who survived, later develop mild to severe cognitive impairment, learning disabilities. The mortality rate is about 10%-11% in FIRES. Most of the patients died due to sepsis, obstinate status epilepticus, and also hazardous of treatment. The mortality rate in the severe phase is between 10-11%. The major reasons behind the mortality, are uncontrollable SE, limitations, difficulties in treatment, and also sepsis.

Treatment
he clinicians often faced difficulty to treat FIRES using antiepileptic drugs. There is evidence of a very subtle response against anticonvulsant by the patients of FIRES. In some cases, to control the seizures, the patient frequently needs deep sedation with anesthetic drugs. Long-term treatment plan is also necessary for FIRES.

Ketogenic Diet
Ketogenic diet is effective in some cases, with efficacy ranging from 16% to over 85%. The features of the ketogenic diet are high protein and low carbohydrate. It has a good success rate for those who are suffering from refractory seizures. The effects of the diet are raises of fatty acids, inflection of glycemia, and comparative limitations in calories. Ketogenic diet can work as an anticonvulsant as well as anti-inflammation. If the KD can start early, it would help for effective and long-term management of epilepsy. KD may not only have an anticonvulsant effect (e.g., through the production of decanoic acid which induces a direct inhibition of the post-synaptic excitatory AMPA) but also anti-inflammatory. Early introduction of a KD could be effective not only during the acute phase but also in long-term epilepsy management.

Vegus Nerve Stimulation
Vagus nerve stimulation helps control seizure activity after recovery from the status. Vagus nerve stimulation (VNS) supports regulator seizure action after retrieval from SEVagus nerve stimulation (VNS) supports regulator seizure action after retrieval from SE.

Intravenous immunoglobulin
Intravenous immunoglobulin treatment is being explored as an option to treat this form of epilepsy.

Barbiturates
Barbiturates have been shown to be effective in treating status epilepsy.

History
FIRES was named in 2008 by Dr. Andreas van Baalen and colleagues. Previous names include AERRPS (acute encephalitis with refractory, repetitive partial seizures), DESC (Devastating Epilepsy in School-aged Children), and NORSE (New-Onset Refractory Status Epilepticus).

EEG Findings 
EEG findings suggest FIRES is a focal process with focal onset seizures. In a 2011 study of 77 FIRES patients, 58 had focal seizures. Of the 58, 50 had secondarily generalizing seizures (seizures that evolve from focal to generalized). On a 10-20 scalp electrode EEG, the ictal activity commonly begins temporally and spreads hemispherically and/or bilaterally. Interictally, patients may have slowing that may be considered an encephalopathic pattern. A recent study of 12 FIRES patients demonstrated diffuse delta-theta background slowing interictally in all 12 cases.

References

External links 

Epilepsy types
Syndromes of unknown causes
Syndromes affecting the nervous system
Rare syndromes